Priya Tendulkar (19 October 1954 – 19 September 2002) was an Indian actress, social activist and a writer, who is most known for her eponymous role in the television series Rajani (1985).

Early life
Priya displayed an inclination towards art and culture from her childhood, as her father was the eminent popular writer and Padma bhushan awardee Vijay Tendulkar.

Career
Her first appearance was as a doll in a stage play called Hayavadana (1969), along with Kalpana Lajmi. Later, she shuffled between different jobs as a hotel service receptionist in a 5 star hotel, an air hostess, and a part-time model, and also she was a news reader.

Her debut film appearance was in Shyam Benegal's Ankur (1974), where she played Anant Nag's submissive wife. Thereafter, she switched her interest towards Marathi films and played stellar roles in nearly a dozen Marathi family socials, opposite actors like Ashok Saraf, Ravindra Mahajani and Mahesh Kothare. She also appears opposite to Anant Nag in the Kannada movie Minchina Ota, in an important role. 
 
She rose to national fame with her TV series Rajani (1985), where she played a housewife who can't stand any injustice and solves public social issues. Her portrayal of Rajani made her a household name all over India. Later, she played a role in Vijay Tendulkar's  TV series, Swayamsiddha.

Priya led a freestyle life wherein she spoke about social issues openly without fear and always expressed her feelings without  bias or prejudice.  This side of her fiery personality reflected in her talk shows like Priya Tendulkar Talk Show and Zimmedar Kaun.

She also played an important role as actress in a Gujarati movie named Pooja Na Phool, which was a very popular movie of the time.

She has also played a role in Hum Panch TV series and she got very famous with that role.

Personal life
She married her Rajani co-star, Karan Razdan, in 1988 but they separated in 1995.

Death
Priya died following a heart attack on 19 September 2002 at her Prabhadevi residence after a long battle with breast cancer.

Filmography

Film

Television

References

External links

1954 births
2002 deaths
Actresses in Marathi cinema
Indian film actresses
Actresses in Hindi cinema
Indian television actresses
Indian television talk show hosts
Actresses from Mumbai
20th-century Indian actresses
Indian women activists
Indian women television presenters